The following is a list of the television and radio networks and announcers that have broadcast the Grey Cup in English.

Television

2020s

Notes
In May 2020, due to postponement of the regular season and other factors relating to the COVID-19 pandemic, it was announced that the 108th Grey Cup festivities in Regina, Saskatchewan (which were to be the first to be hosted by the new Mosaic Stadium) had been cancelled and postponed to 2022, and that the site of the game, if held, would be based on regular season records rather than as a neutral site. The Grey Cup itself was later cancelled in August along with the 2020 CFL season, which was the first year that the Grey Cup was not contested since 1919.

2010s

2000s

Notes
Beginning in 2008, TSN gained exclusive coverage rights to the CFL.

1990s

1980s

Notes
The 1982 Grey Cup broadcast drew the largest Canadian TV audience up to that time.
After the 1986 season, CTV dropped coverage of the CFL altogether. In response to this, the CFL formed its own syndicated network, called CFN (Canadian Football Network). CFN had completely separate coverage of the Grey Cup (when compared to CBC), utilizing its own production and commentators. From 1987–1989, a weekly CFN game telecast, including playoffs and the Grey Cup championship, aired in the United States on a tape-delay basis on ESPN.
The CFL operated the Canadian Football Network, a coalition of private broadcasters that shared league games and the Grey Cup with the CBC, from 1987 to 1990.

1970s

Notes
From 1971–1986, CBC and CTV fully pooled their commentary teams for the game. The first set of commentators listed described the first half of the game, and the second set described the rest of the game.

1960s

Notes
From 1962–1986, CBC and CTV simulcast the Grey Cup. For 1962, 1965, 1967, 1968 and 1970, CTV's commentators were used for the dual network telecast. Meanwhile, in 1963, 1964, 1966 and 1969, CBC's announcers were provided.
The CBC carried the first national telecasts exclusively, but the CTV Television Network purchased rights to the 1962 game. The move sparked concern across Canada as the newly formed network was not yet available in many parts of the country. The debate over whether an "event of national interest" should be broadcast by the publicly funded CBC or private broadcasters reached the floor of Parliament as members of the federal government weighed in. It was decided that both networks would carry the game. The two networks continued with the simulcast arrangement until 1986 when CTV ceased its coverage.

1950s

Notes
Canadian television was in its infancy in 1952 when Toronto's CBLT paid $7,500 for the rights to carry the first televised broadcast of a Grey Cup game. Within two years, it was estimated that 80 percent of the nation's 900,000 television sets were tuned into the game, even though the first national telecast did not occur until 1957. The Grey Cup continues to be one of Canada's most-viewed sporting events.

United States
NBC: 1954  – The predecessor to the CFL's East Division, the IRFU, had a television contract with NBC in 1954 that provided far more coverage than the NFL's existing contract with DuMont. NBC aired games on Saturday afternoons, competing against college football broadcasts on CBS and ABC. The revenue from the contract allowed the IRFU to directly compete against the NFL for players in the late 1950s, setting up a series of CFL games in the United States beginning in 1958 and a series of interleague exhibitions beginning in 1959. Interest in the CFL in the United States faded dramatically after the debut of the American Football League in 1960.
ABC: 1962 on ABC's Wide World of Sports
Syndicated: 1966 (WNJU, WPHL-TV, KTLA)
Syndicated: 1972–1974 (WOR, WKGB, KTTV, WFLD, KBCW, WTAF, KMPH, WKEF, KFIZ-TV, WVTV, KCOP)
ESPN: 1980–1984 – ESPN host Chris Berman became a fan of the game in the early days of ESPN, when the network used to air CFL games, and continues to cover the Canadian league on-air. 
SCORE: 1985 – FNN-SCORE is unrelated to the Canadian "The Score".
ESPN: 1986–1989, 2016–2023
SportsChannel America: 1990–1993 – SportsChannel America used the CBC Television and CFN feeds.
ESPN2: 1994–1997, 2014–2023 – Beginning in 1994, with now four US-based teams in the league, ESPN reached a deal with the league to produce and air two games per week and all post-season games on its fledgling ESPN2. They also put some games on the main network to fill broadcast time vacated by the 1994–95 Major League Baseball strike. The 1994 and 1995 Grey Cups were shown live on ESPN2 and then re-aired on ESPN the following day, leading into the network's Monday Night Countdown show. ESPN's on-air talent included a mix of the network's American football broadcasters and established CFL broadcasters from Canada. Most of the US-based teams also had deals with local carriers to show games that were not covered in the national package. Though there were no US teams in the league after 1995, ESPN2 continued showing games until 1997.
Regional sports networks and America One: 2001–2007, 2009–2010  – America One held CFL broadcast rights in the United States from 2004 to 2009 and aired a majority of the league's games. Until the 2007 season, America One syndicated CFL games to regional sports networks like Altitude, NESN, and MASN; these were discontinued in 2008, mainly because America One and the CFL were able to reach a deal only days before the season began, not allowing the network time to establish agreements with individual RSNs. The Grey Cup aired on Versus on November 22, 2008, with a replay the next day on America One. From 2006 through the 2008 season, Friday Night Football was carried exclusively on World Sport HD in the United States; however, due to the January 2009 shutdown of that channel's parent company, Voom HD Networks, America One reclaimed those rights.
Versus: 2008
ESPN3: 2009–present – On July 1, 2010, NFL Network began airing live Canadian Football League games simulcast from Canada's TSN. NFL Network aired Thursday games, three Saturday games in July, and then Friday night games beginning again in September (after ArenaBowl XXIII). NFL Network didn't air CFL games in August due to a large number of NFL preseason broadcasts. In addition, NFL Network didn't show any playoff games, including the Grey Cup championship, as those games are all played on Sundays opposite the NFL. Those games were instead broadcast on the online service ESPN3, a sister network to TSN. NFL Network announced it would not renew its deal with the CFL on May 25, 2012.
NBC Sports Network: 2012–2013
ESPNEWS: 2016–2023
Bally Sports: 2024–future

1990s

Radio
The Grey Cup game was first broadcast on radio in 1928. The Canadian Broadcasting Corporation (CBC) carried radio coverage of the game for 51 years until 1986, when a network of private broadcasters took over.

2020s

2010s

2000s

Notes
CFL teams had local broadcast contracts with terrestrial radio stations for regular season and playoff games, while The Fan Radio Network (Rogers Communications) owned the rights to the Grey Cup. In 2006, Sirius Satellite Radio gained exclusive rights for North American CFL satellite radio broadcasts and broadcast 25 CFL games per season, including the Grey Cup, through 2008.

1990s

The 1978 and 1979 Grey Cups were broadcast to the United States by Moon Radio Network, Inc., of Pittsburgh, Pennsylvania. For both broadcasts, Harold Johnson of Charlotte, North Carolina, was the play-by-play announcer, and Russell Moon of Pittsburgh, Pennsylvania, was the analyst. The 1978 halftime guest was future Hall of Famer Terry Evanshen, then of the Toronto Argonauts. The 1978 broadcast had 9 affiliates, and the 1979 broadcast had 27 affiliates.

See also
Grey Cup#Broadcasting
Canadian Football League#Broadcasting

References

ABC Sports
Canadian Football League announcers
Canadian Football League on television
CBC Sports
CTV Sports
ESPN2
First-run syndicated television programs in the United States
broadcasters
Grey Cup
NBCSN
Simulcasts
SportsChannel
The Sports Network
Wide World of Sports (American TV series)
CBC Radio